The Daule River is a river in Ecuador, in Guayas Province.  At Guayaquil, it joins the Babahoyo River; from that point the confluence becomes the Guayas River.

Cities along the river
Pichincha, Ecuador
Balzar
Colimes
Palestina
Santa Lucía
Daule
Nobol
Guayaquil

Rivers of Ecuador
Geography of Guayas Province